The list of ship decommissionings in 1952 includes a chronological list of all ships decommissioned in 1952.


References

See also 

1952
 
Ship